Spouse of the Prime Minister of the Republic of the Union of Myanmar is the title held by the wife of the Prime Minister.

The current wife of Min Aung Hlaing, who assumed the role on 1 August 2021, is Kyu Kyu Hla.

History
In post-independence Burma, the presidential system is in place, but the real power is the prime minister.  U Nu, who succeeded General Aung San, ruled the country for more than a decade in 1962.  Therefore, U Nu's wife, Mya Yi, is the first Spouse of the prime minister of Burma.

List of Spouse of Prime Minister of Myanmar

References 

Myanmar